Sander Helven (born 30 May 1990 in Hasselt) is a Belgian former cyclist, who rode professionally between 2011 and 2016 for the  and  teams.

Major results
2011
 2nd National Under-23 Road Race Championships
2012
 1st Omloop Het Nieuwsblad U23
 3rd Flèche Ardennaise
2013
 3rd GP Briek Schotte
2014
 1st Stage 1 Étoile de Bessèges
2016
 1st  Mountains classification Tour du Poitou Charentes

References

External links

1990 births
Living people
Belgian male cyclists
Sportspeople from Hasselt
Cyclists from Limburg (Belgium)
21st-century Belgian people